La Playa DC is a 2012 internationally co-produced drama film written and directed by Juan Andrés Arango. The film competed in the Un Certain Regard section at the 2012 Cannes Film Festival. The film was selected as the Colombian entry for the Best Foreign Language Film at the 86th Academy Awards, but it was not nominated.

Cast
 Luis Carlos Guevara as Tomás
 Jamés Solís as Chaco
 Andrés Murillo as Jairo

See also
 List of submissions to the 86th Academy Awards for Best Foreign Language Film
 List of Colombian submissions for the Academy Award for Best Foreign Language Film

References

External links
 

2012 films
2012 drama films
2010s Spanish-language films
Films directed by Juan Andrés Arango
2012 directorial debut films
Colombian drama films
2010s Colombian films
2010s French films